Medford High School may refer to:

 Medford High School (Massachusetts), Medford, Massachusetts
 Medford High School (Minnesota), Medford, Minnesota
 Medford Area Senior High School, Medford, Wisconsin
 North Medford High School, Medford, Oregon
 Old Medford High School, Medford, Massachusetts
 South Medford High School, Medford, Oregon
 Medford Opportunity High School, alternative HS in Medford, Oregon